The Surveillance and Control Training Unit is a training unit of the Royal Australian Air Force. It is provides training and training development of air defence.

Formed in 1999 to provide training to the Surveillance and Control Group. In 2000, the unit relocated to the Eastern Regional Operations Centre at RAAF Base Williamtown and provides training for No. 41 Wing.

References
http://www.defence.gov.au/news/raafnews/editions/4616/history/story01.htm

RAAF training units